Hatun Pawka (Quechua hatun big, pawka a plant (Escallonia herrerae), Hispanicized spelling Jatunpauca) is a  mountain in the Cordillera Central in the Andes of Peru. It is located in the Lima Region, Yauyos Province, on the border of the districts of Miraflores and Tanta. Hatun Pawka lies on a ridge southeast of Paqarin Pawka and northeast of a lake named Pisququcha.

References

Mountains of Peru
Mountains of Lima Region